Pisulus tipuliformis is a species of assassin bug in the subfamily Harpactorinae. The females of this species exhibit maternal care, and can distinguish their own eggs from other females of the same species.

Sources

Reduviidae
Taxa named by Johan Christian Fabricius